Airavata ( "belonging to Iravati") is a white elephant who carries the deity Indra. It is also called 'abhra-Matanga', meaning "elephant of the clouds"; 'Naga-malla', meaning "the fighting elephant"; and 'Arkasodara', meaning "brother of the sun".  'Abhramu' is the elephant wife of Airavata. Airavata has four tusks and seven trunks and is spotless white. Airavata is also the third son of Iravati. In the Mahabharata he is listed as a great serpent.

Hindu tradition

According to the Ramayana, the elephant's mother was Iravati. According to the Matangalila, Airavata was born when Brahma sang sacred hymns over the halves of the egg shell from which Garuda hatched, followed by seven more male and eight female elephants. Prithu made Airavata king of all elephants. One of his names means "the one who knits or binds the clouds" since myth has it that these elephants are capable of producing clouds. The connection of elephants with water and rain is emphasized in the mythology of Indra, who rides the elephant Airavata when he defeats Vritra.

As per another legend, Airavata is believed to have come out of churning the ocean of milk and it is believed that the elephant guards one of the points of compass.
Airavata also stands at the entrance to Svarga, Indra's palace. In addition, the eight guardian deities who preside over the points of the compass each sit on an elephant. Each of these deities has an elephant that takes part in the defense and protection of its respective quarter. Chief among them is Airavata of Indra. There is a reference to Airavata in the Bhagavad Gita:

At Darasuram near Tanjore is a temple where it is believed that Airavata worshipped the Lingam; the Lingam is named after him as Airavateshwara. This temple, which abounds in rare sculpture and architectural workmanship, was built by Rajaraja Chola II (1146–73 CE).

Jain tradition
In Jain tradition, when a Tirthankara is born, Indra descends with his consort, Shachi, riding their mount, the great elephant Airavata, to celebrate the event.

Flags with Airavata
 Laos

 Siam (Thailand)

Erawan

Erawan (from Pāḷi Erāvana, or Sanskrit Airāvana) is one of the Thai names of Airavata. It is depicted as a huge elephant with either three or sometimes thirty-three heads which are often shown with more than two tusks. Some statues show Indra, the king of Tavatimsa Heaven, riding on Erawan.

The elephant became the symbol of Bangkok by association with Indra during its foundation as the capital of the new Rattanakosin Kingdom . It is also sometimes associated with the old Lao Kingdom of Lan Xang and the defunct Kingdom of Laos, where it was more commonly known as the "three-headed elephant" and had been used on the royal flag.

In popular culture
Airavata is a recruitable character in the Megami Tensei video game series.

Airavata is referenced in the song "The Animal Tent" on the album The Circus by The Venetia Fair:

Airavata is the name of the Volvo bus service that Karnataka State Road Transport Corporation provides.

See also
 Erawan Shrine

Citations

General references

External links 
 

Elephants in Indian culture
Elephants in Thailand
Hindu iconography
Hindu legendary creatures
Indian legendary characters
Mythological elephants
Non-human races in Hindu mythology
Thai art
Thai culture
Elephants in Buddhism
Elephants in Hinduism